PeroxWhy?Gen (pronounced peroxygen) is an American rock band from North Carolina started by professional wrestlers Jeff Hardy and Shannon Moore. Then members of the metal band Burnside 6 joined the band, but later left except for Junior Merrill. Shannon Moore left the band to focus on his wrestling career. The band's debut album Plurality of Worlds was released on November 7, 2013. The next album, Within the Cygnus Rift, was released on July 27, 2015. Precession of the Equinoxes, their third album, was released on July 17, 2017.

History
Jeff Hardy realised his childhood ambition of becoming a rock singer by setting up a band with fellow wrestler Shannon Moore. Members of bands Fueled by Science and Burnside 6 later joined the band.

Jeff Hardy, came upon the name 'Peroxwhy?gen' while looking at an aerosol can. He combined the words, peroxide and oxygen then added  'why?' creating the name, 'Peroxwhy?gen'.

Band members
Current members
 Jeff Hardy - lead vocals, programming  (2003–present)
 Junior Merrill - guitars, vocals (2003–present)
 John Mark Painter - bass, backing vocals (2014–present)
 Dale Oliver - rhythm guitar, backing vocals (2012–present)
 Bobby Huff - drums (2012–present); bass (2012–2014)

Past members
 Shannon Moore - programming, lead vocals (2003–2012)

Discography
Studio albums
Plurality of Worlds (2013)
Within the Cygnus Rift (2015)
Precession of the Equinoxes (2017)

References

 

Musical groups from North Carolina
Musical groups established in 2003
Alternative rock groups from North Carolina